Marble Furnace is an unincorporated community in Adams County, Ohio.

History
Marble Furnace was founded ca. 1812.  The community took its name from Marble Furnace, a blast furnace. A post office called Marble Furnace was established in 1848, and remained in operation until 1879.

References

Unincorporated communities in Adams County, Ohio
1812 establishments in Ohio
Populated places established in 1812
Unincorporated communities in Ohio